The Almont League is a high school athletic conference in Los Angeles County, California, USA, which includes six high schools, three from the Alhambra Unified School District and three from the Montebello Unified School District affiliated with the CIF Southern Section. Its name is a portmanteau of the words "Alhambra" and "Montebello". The league was created at the start of the 1992-93 school year and it is affiliated with the Foothill Area.

Schools
The schools in the league are:
Alhambra High School
Bell Gardens High School	
Mark Keppel High School (Alhambra, California)
Montebello High School
San Gabriel High School
Schurr High School (Montebello, California)

References

CIF Southern Section leagues